Sadiković is a Bosnian patronymic surname formed by adding the Slavic diminutive suffixes -ov and -ić to either one of the masculine given names of Arabic origin Sadiq (honest) or Sadeeq (friend) – both from the Arabic root ص د ق (ṣ-d-q) – and may refer to:

 Amra Sadiković (born 1989), Swiss tennis player
 Damir Sadiković (born 1995), Bosnian footballer

References

Bosnian surnames
Patronymic surnames
Surnames from given names